Chillakallu is a village in NTR district of the Indian state of Andhra Pradesh. It is located in Jaggayyapeta mandal of Vijayawada revenue division. It is one of the villages in the mandal, to be a part of Andhra Pradesh Capital Region.

References 

Villages in NTR district